A rule complex is a set consisting of rules and/or other rule complexes.  This is a generalization of a set of rules, and provides a tool to investigate and describe how rules can function as values, norms, judgmental or prescriptive rules, and meta-rules.  Also possible is to examine objects consisting of rules such as roles, routines, algorithms, models of reality, social relationships, and institutions.  In game theory, rules and rule complexes can be used to define the behavior and interactions of the players (although in generalized game theory, the rules are not necessarily static.  Rule complexes are especially associated with sociologist Tom R. Burns and Anna Gomolinska and the Uppsala Theory Circle.

Formalization

Rules
In this setting, a rule is type of knowledge (in the sense of epistemic logic (see Fagin, 2003)) formalized as a set of premises or conditions, a set of justifications, and a set of conclusions (this may be written as a triple, a rule ). Elements of X should hold, and of Y may hold. If Y, the justifications, do not hold, then the rule cannot be applied. If X and Y are empty, then the rule is axiomatic (a "fact" or unconditional directive). Thus, rules can be seen as the basic objects of knowledge.

Rule complex
Formally, a rule complex is the class which contains all finite sets of rules, is closed under set-theoretical union and power set, and preserves inclusion:

Any finite set of rules is a rule complex;

References
Fagin, Ronald et al. Reasoning about Knowledge. Cambridge: MIT Press, 2003.
Burns T.R., Roszkowska E. (2005) Generalized Game Theory: Assumptions, Principles, and Elaborations Grounded in Social Theory, In Search of Social Order, “Studies in Logic, Grammar, and Rhetoric”, Vol. 8(21):7–40.
Gomolińska Anna, (1999) Rule complexes for representing social actors and interactions. "Studies in Logic, Grammar and Rhetoric", Volume 3(16):95–108.
Gomolińska,Anna (2004) Fundamental mathematical notions of the theory of
socially embedded games: A granular computing perspective. In S. K. Pal, L. Polkowski and A. Skowron (eds). "Rough-Neural Computing: Techniques for Computing with Words", Springer, Berlin Heidelberg, pages 411–434.

Game theory
Sociological theories